Sam Singer (born February 14, 1995) is an American-Israeli professional basketball player who last played for Bnei Herzliya of the Israeli Premier League. He played college basketball for the California Golden Bears. In his four years at Cal, he was a three-time Pac-12 All-Academic Honorable Mention and played the third-most games in school history.

Early life 
Singer is from Miami, Florida, and is Jewish. His mother is Jani Kline Singer. His paternal grandfather, David, served in the U.S. Army in World War II.

He attended Ransom Everglades School in Miami, Florida, where he regarded as one of the top guard prospects in the state of Florida. Singer averaged 27.3 points, 10.4 rebounds and 7.3 assists to lead the Raiders to the Class 4A state semifinals and a 27-3 record as a senior. He was named to the Florida vs. U.S.A. Hardwood Classic All-Star team in 2013.

College career
Singer played college basketball for the California Golden Bears, where he averaged 4.5 points, 2.9 rebounds, and 1.9 assists in 20.1 minutes of action. Singer was named an Allstate Good Works Team nominee for his dedication to serving the community and Pac-12 All-Academic Honorable Mention. In his four years at Cal, he was a three-time Pac-12 All-Academic Honorable Mention and played the third-most games in school history with 133. He graduated from Berkeley in 2017 with a degree in Business Administration from the Haas School of Business.

Professional career
On August 4, 2017, Singer started his professional career with Bnei Herzliya of the Israeli Premier League, signing a three-year deal. On February 10, 2019, Singer parted ways with Herzliya.

Maccabiah Games
Singer played for Team USA in basketball at the 2017 Maccabiah Games, where he won a gold medal and averaged 9.3 points per game. He played on the team with among others Jordan Cohen and Travis Warech.

References

External links
 California bio
 RealGM profile

1994 births
Living people
American expatriate basketball people in Israel
American men's basketball players
Basketball players from Florida
Bnei Hertzeliya basketball players
California Golden Bears men's basketball players
People from Miami
Point guards
Shooting guards
Jewish men's basketball players
Competitors at the 2017 Maccabiah Games
Maccabiah Games medalists in basketball
Maccabiah Games gold medalists for the United States
Maccabiah Games basketball players of the United States
21st-century American Jews